The 2019 Saint Louis FC season is the club's fifth season of existence, and their fifth consecutive season in the USL Championship, the second tier of American soccer. Saint Louis will additionally compete in the U.S. Open Cup.

Saint Louis moved back to the Eastern Conference this season, after spending 2018 in the Western Conference.

Roster

Competitions

Preseason

USL Championship

Standings

Results summary

Results by round

Match results

On December 19, 2018, the USL announced their 2019 season schedule.

All times in Central Time unless otherwise noted.

U.S. Open Cup

As a member of the USL Championship, Saint Louis FC entered the tournament in the Second Round, played on May 14–15, 2019.

References

Saint Louis FC
2019
Saint Louis
Saint Louis FC